Peter Doyle (December 8, 1844 – October  27, 1900) was an Irish-American politician from the U.S. state of Wisconsin.

Biography
Born in Myshall, County Carlow, Ireland, Doyle moved with his parents to Franklin, Wisconsin, in Milwaukee County, Wisconsin in 1850. Doyle taught school and studied law in Milwaukee, Wisconsin. He served as that state's eleventh Secretary of State, serving for two terms from January 5, 1874 to January 7, 1878. He was a Democrat and served under governors William Robert Taylor and Harrison Ludington. He also served in the Wisconsin State Assembly from Crawford County, Wisconsin in 1873. He resided in Prairie du Chien, Wisconsin at the time of his election and served as secretary to John Lawler and Hercules Dousman. From 1884 to 1900, Doyle practiced law in Milwaukee, Wisconsin. He took a law course at Yale University. In 1900, Doyle moved to Jersey City, New Jersey, where he died on October 27, 1900.

References

Further reading

Secretaries of State of Wisconsin
1844 births
1900 deaths
People from County Carlow
People from Prairie du Chien, Wisconsin
Politicians from Milwaukee
Politicians from Jersey City, New Jersey
Irish emigrants to the United States (before 1923)
Wisconsin lawyers
19th-century American politicians
People from Franklin, Milwaukee County, Wisconsin
19th-century American lawyers
Democratic Party members of the Wisconsin State Assembly